The Hispaniolan pine forests are a subtropical coniferous forest ecoregion found on the Caribbean island of Hispaniola, which is shared by Haiti and the Dominican Republic. It is surrounded at lower elevations by the Hispaniolan moist forests and Hispaniolan dry forests ecoregions, which cover the remainder of the island.

Flora
The natural vegetation of the region consists primarily of stands of pino criollo (Pinus occidentalis). Pines are mixed with other conifers, including sabina (Juniperus gracilior) and Podocarpus aristulatus (syn. P. buchii). Below , pine forests are found on lateritic soils and are interspersed with areas of wet montane forest.  Important broad-leaved species are Garrya fadyenii and Vaccinium cubense near Constanza and the Sierra de Bahoruco, Rapanea ferruginea near Jarabacoa and San José de las Matas, and Buddleja domingensis along the Cordillera Central. Plants of montane steppe include cara de hombre (Lyonia spp.), abey (Cojoba arborea), yaya fina (Oxandra lanceolata), pajón (Danthonia domingensis), Verbena officinalis var. officinalis, and Weinmannia pinnata.

Fauna
Many endemic and rare animal species occur in this ecoregion, including the Hispaniolan crossbill (Loxia megaplaga), white-winged warbler (Xenoligea montana), golden swallow (Tachycineta euchrysea) and the Darlington's galliwasp (Caribicus darlingtoni).

Threats
More than half of the ecoregion's area has been lost to clearing for agriculture, pasture, or plantations of exotic trees. The Haitian portion of the ecoregion is much more deforested than the Dominican portion.

References

Tropical and subtropical coniferous forests
Ecoregions of the Caribbean
Ecoregions of the Dominican Republic
Ecoregions of Haiti
Neotropical ecoregions